Acraea newtoni is a butterfly in the family Nymphalidae. It is found on São Tomé Island.

Description

A. newtoni E. Sharpe. Forewing blackish with a rounded whitish spot in 2 and a whitish subapical band in 4-6; hindwing blackish above, just beyond the apex of the cell with a red-yellow median band, of a uniform breadth of 3 mm., which does not quite reach the inner margin, beneath greenish light grey with black dots as far as the apex of the cell, otherwise as above. Island of Sao Thome; only one male known.

Taxonomy
It is a member of the Acraea circeis species group - but see also Pierre & Bernaud, 2014

References

External links

 Images representing  Acraea newtoni at Bold.

Butterflies described in 1893
newtoni
Endemic fauna of São Tomé Island
Butterflies of Africa